Pelagodoxa henryana is a species of palm tree, and the only species in the genus Pelagodoxa. It is found only in the Marquesas Islands of French Polynesia, where it is threatened by habitat loss.

References

Arecoideae
Flora of French Polynesia
Critically endangered plants
Monotypic Arecaceae genera
Taxa named by Odoardo Beccari
Taxonomy articles created by Polbot